X9 is a series of four-car electric multiple units operated by Statens Järnvägar (SJ) of Sweden as express trains. Twenty-three were built by Hilding Carlssons Mekaniska Verkstad between 1960–1963 and were in service with SJ until 1999. The sharp reddish orange colour gave the trains the nickname Paprika trains.

History
The X9 was partially based on the X20/X21-series delivered by Hilding Carlsson to the private company TGOJ. The X9 was put into service in Southern Sweden and from Stockholm to Dalarna. During the 1970s all the units were moved to either Skåne or to the Göteborg area, and during the 1980s all units were moved to the latter area.

External links
Järnväg.net on X9 

X09
X09

15 kV AC multiple units